Tiantangbao  is a station on Line 2 of Chongqing Rail Transit in Chongqing Municipality, China, which opened in 2014. It is located in Dadukou District. Currently, it also serves as the southern terminus of 8 car trains.

Station structure

References

Railway stations in Chongqing
Railway stations in China opened in 2014
Chongqing Rail Transit stations